Hohl is a surname. Notable people with the surname include:

 Anton Friedrich Hohl (1789–1862), German professor
 Arthur Hohl (1889–1964), American character actor
 Daryl Hall (born 1946 as Daryl Franklin Hohl), American singer and songwriter
 David Hohl (born 1966), Canadian wrestler
 Ludwig Hohl (1904–1980), Swiss author
 Joan Hohl (born 1935), American author

German-language surnames